is a former Japanese football player.

Playing career
Tokura was born in Kanagawa Prefecture on May 31, 1971. After graduating from Aoyama Gakuin University, he joined Verdy Kawasaki in 1994. He played many matches as left side back from first season. The club also won the champions 1994 J1 League and 1994 J.League Cup. However his opportunity to play decreased in 1996. In 1997, he moved to Japan Football League club Kawasaki Frontale and he played many matches. In 1998, he moved to Gamba Osaka. However he could hardly play in the match. In 1999, he moved to Kyoto Purple Sanga and he played as regular player as left side back. In July, he returned to Verdy Kawasaki. However he could hardly play in the match and left the club end of 1999 season. After 1 season blank, he joined J2 League club Shonan Bellmare and played in 1 season. He retired end of 2001 season.

Club statistics

References

External links

sports.geocities.jp

1971 births
Living people
Aoyama Gakuin University alumni
Association football people from Kanagawa Prefecture
Japanese footballers
J1 League players
J2 League players
Japan Football League (1992–1998) players
Tokyo Verdy players
Kawasaki Frontale players
Gamba Osaka players
Kyoto Sanga FC players
Shonan Bellmare players
Association football defenders